Rodney S. "Rod" Ruoff is an American physical chemist and nanoscience researcher. He is one of the world experts on carbon materials including carbon nanostructures such as fullerenes, nanotubes, graphene, diamond, and has had pioneering discoveries on such materials and others. Ruoff received his B.S. in Chemistry from the University of Texas at Austin (1981) and his Ph.D. in Chemical Physics at the University of Illinois-Urbana (1988). After a Fulbright Fellowship at the MPI fuer Stroemungsforschung in Goettingen, Germany (1989) and postdoctoral work at the IBM T. J. Watson Research Center (1990–91), Ruoff became a staff scientist in the Molecular Physics Laboratory at SRI International (1991–1996). He is currently UNIST Distinguished Professor at the Ulsan National Institute of Science and Technology (UNIST), and the director of the Center for Multidimensional Carbon Materials, an Institute for Basic Science Center located at UNIST.

Research 
Rod Ruoff and his research groups have made seminal contributions to developing new synthesis techniques and improving our understanding of properties of novel materials including nanostructures and 2D materials, especially novel carbon materials (graphene, diamond, nanotubes, sp3-sp2 hybrids, negative curvature carbon, carbon nanofoams, boron nitride allotropes, fullerenes, etc.). Some examples of pioneering studies, among others, include:(i) of the mechanics of C60, and of nanotubes, including pullout of inner shell with respect to outer shell of the nanotube, and of a connection between mechanical deformation and structure on the one hand, and chemical reactivity on the other;(ii) of solubility phenomena of fullerenes, nanotubes, and graphene;(iii) of carbon-encapsulated metal nanoparticles;(iv) of patterned graphite and thus micromechanically exfoliated graphene-like flakes;(v) of scaled growth of graphene on copper and copper-nickel foils;(vi) of isotopically labeled graphites (graphite oxide) and graphene;(vii) of graphene oxide and reduced graphene oxide and composites and paper-like films composed of them;(viii) of the use of chemically modified graphene and graphite foam for electrode materials in electrical energy storage;(ix) of graphene as a support film for biological TEM;(x) of graphene as a protective coating against oxidation (and corrosion) (please also note Appl. Phys. Lett. 92, 052506 (2008) and Appl. Phys. Lett. 93, 022509 (2008)). Ruoff provided some personal perspectives on graphene and new carbon materials ‘on the horizon’ in 2012. As a graduate student at the University of Illinois-Urbana, Ruoff and colleagues published seminal papers on the structure of weakly bound clusters formed in supersonic jets, and of relaxation processes in supersonic jets.

His predictions with A. L. Ruoff about the mechanical response of fullerite under high pressure, and his work with colleagues on the unique solvation phenomena of C60 in various solvent systems, and of synthesis and structural characterization of supergiant fullerenes containing single crystal metal ‘encapsulates’, have demonstrated to the scientific community the novel properties of closed-shell carbon structures. He also co-developed a new in-situ mechanical testing device for measuring the tensile response of bundles of SWCNTs and individual MWCNTs inside of a scanning electron microscope. This work has yielded important insights into the mechanics and tribology of these systems, and suggested the possibility of very low friction linear bearings. Similarly, Ruoff and collaborators were the first to use solubility parameters to rationalize the solubility of fullerenes, of single-walled nanotubes, and of chemically modified graphenes. Furthermore, Rod is credited with first creating graphene by lithographic patterning to make single crystal graphite micropillars; he and his team achieved thereby single crystal multilayer graphene platelets.

From 2009, Ruoff and collaborators have demonstrated synthesis of large area monolayer graphene on copper foil by chemical vapor deposition, for which relatively high carrier mobilities have been obtained, and subsequently have used isotopic labeling and micro-Raman mapping to map grains and grain boundaries in such atom thick layers and to elucidate growth mechanisms, and studied their performance as transparent conductive electrodes. Ruoff and his collaborators have also made a series of advances in novel composite systems comprising chemically modified graphene platelets.

Ruoff and his team were the first to use graphene as electrodes of electrochemical capacitors, reporting on graphene supercapacitors in 2008. In 2011, Ruoff and his group reported on a new carbon, potentially having regions of ‘negative curvature carbon’ (NCC) with a remarkably high specific surface area of 3100 m2 g−1, and atom-thick carbon sp2-bonded walls that define pores varying in diameter from about 0.6 to 5 nm. They showed that this type of porous carbon (‘a-MEGO’) works very well as an electrode material for double-layer supercapacitors, a very exciting advance.

Rod and his team continue to make contributions at the Institute for Basic Science Center for Multidimensional Carbon Materials with a focus on carbon and related materials but also in some other research topics.

Rod has a Hirsch factor of 156. He is inventor or co-inventor on 60 issued patents.

Positions 
 UNIST Distinguished Professor, Ulsan National Institute of Science and Technology (2014–present)
UNIST affiliations: Department of Chemistry, School of Materials Science, School of Energy and Chemical Engineering
 Director of the Center for Multidimensional Carbon Materials (2013–present)
 Cockrell Family Regents Chair Professor, Mechanical Engineering, The University of Texas at Austin (2007–2013)
 Professor and John Evans Professor, Mechanical Engineering, Northwestern University (2000–2007)
 Associate Professor, Physics, Washington University in St. Louis (1996–2000)
 Staff Scientist, Molecular Physics Laboratory, SRI International (1991–1996)
 Postdoctoral researcher, IBM Thomas J. Watson Research Center (1990–1991)
 Postdoctoral researcher/Fulbright Fellow, Max Planck Institute fuer Stroemungsforschung (1989)

Awards and fellowships 
 Clarivate Citation Laureate (2018), Hall of Citation Laureates 2021
 James C. McGroddy Prize for New Materials (2018), American Physical Society
 American Carbon Society SGL Skakel Award (2016)
 Clarivate Analytics (Thomson Reuters) Highly Cited Researchers – Chemistry (2014–2021), Physics (2015–2018), Materials Science (2016, 2017, 2018, 2019, 2020, 2021)
 Turnbull Award Materials Research Society (2014)
 Materials Research Society Fellow (2013)
 American Association for the Advancement of Science (AAAS) Fellow (2012)
 American Physical Society Fellow (2011)
 Distinguished Chair Visiting Professor (2005–2007), Sungkyunkwan University Advanced Institute of Science and Technology (SAINT)
 Fulbright Fellow (1989)

See also 
 Christopher Bielawski: group leader in Center for Multidimensional Carbon Materials

External links

References

American materials scientists
21st-century American chemists
American physical chemists
University of Texas at Austin faculty
Northwestern University faculty
Living people
University of Illinois Urbana-Champaign alumni
Washington University physicists
1957 births
21st-century American scientists
Institute for Basic Science
Fulbright alumni
Washington University in St. Louis faculty
University of Texas at Austin alumni
Academic staff of Ulsan National Institute of Science and Technology